The 2012–13 Basketball Cup of Serbia is the 7th season of the Serbian 2nd-tier men's cup tournament.

Valjevo-based team Metalac won the Cup.

Bracket
Source: Basketball Federation of Serbia

See also 
 2012–13 Radivoj Korać Cup
 2012–13 Basketball League of Serbia

References

External links 
 Basketball Competitions of Serbia

Basketball Cup of Serbia
Cup